Kramgoa låtar 8 is a 1980 Vikingarna studio album. The album was released in two versions. The album was rereleased to CD in 1996.

Track listing (1980 version)

Side 1
Vad gör än ett år (What's Another Year)
Natt och dag
He'll have to go
Ge mig en sommar
Love letters in the sand
Varför är solen så röd
Vi får hoppas att allting går bra
Jag möter dig

Side 2
Låt dagen bli lång
Maria Maruschka
Rambling rose
Lever i en drömvärld
Release me
Moskva
Krama mej
Brutna löften

Track listing (1996 version)

Side 1
Mot alla vindar
Sun of Jamaica
Vad gör än ett år (What's another year)
Natt och dag
He'll have to go
Love letters in the sand
Varför är solen så röd
Vi får hoppas att allting går bra
Jag möter dig

Side 2
Låt dagen bli lång
Maria Maruschka
Rambling rose
Lever i en drömvärld
Release me
Moskva
Krama mej
Brutna löften

Charts

References 

1980 albums
Vikingarna (band) albums
Swedish-language albums